Clement the Heretic, Irish Abbot and heretic, fl. 8th-10th centuries.

In his account of Irish monasteries in Germany, Hogan mentions an abbot of St. Martin's of Cologne, which was at the time an Irish institution: "Beatus, Virgilius, Fridolinus do not sound very Irish, yet all admit their nationality. German Protestant historians have no doubt about the Irish nationality of Clement the Heretic; yet Clement does not sound particularly Hibernian."

Nothing else appears to be known of Clement.

See also

 Tilmo
 Minnborinus of Cologne

References

 Irish Monasteries in Germany, J.F. Hogan, pp. 526–535, Irish Ecclesiastical Record, 4th series, Vol. 3, 1898.

External links
 https://archive.org/stream/s4irishecclesias03dubluoft#page/526/mode/2up

9th-century Irish abbots
Irish expatriates in Germany